A pack rat is a small rodent in the genus Neotoma. 

Pack rat can also refer to:

A person who engages in compulsive hoarding
Peter Pack Rat, a 1985 arcade game
A packrat parser for parsing expression grammar
Packrat (Transformers), a fictional character in the Transformers universe

See also
Rat Pack (disambiguation)